Giovanni Battista del Tufo, C.R. (1543 – 13 June 1622) was a Roman Catholic prelate who served as Bishop of Acerra (1587–1603).

Biography
Giovanni Battista del Tufo was born in Naples, Italy in 1543 and ordained a deacon on 20 May 1570 and a priest in the Congregation of Clerics Regular of the Divine Providence in March 1572.
On 17 August 1587, he was appointed during the papacy of Pope Sixtus V as Bishop of Acerra.
On 13 December 1587, he was consecrated bishop.
He served as Bishop of Acerra until his resignation on 23 June 1603.
He died on 13 June 1622.

Episcopal succession
While bishop, he was the principal co-consecrator of:

References

External links and additional sources
 (for Chronology of Bishops) 
 (for Chronology of Bishops) 

16th-century Italian Roman Catholic bishops
17th-century Italian Roman Catholic bishops
Bishops appointed by Pope Sixtus V
1543 births
1622 deaths
Clergy from Naples
Theatine bishops